Time Stream: Toshiko Plays Toshiko is a small jazz combo album by pianist Toshiko Akiyoshi playing her own compositions.  It was recorded in 1996 and released by Nippon Crown Records.   This recording is not to be confused with the 1984 Toshiko Akiyoshi Trio recording, Time Stream or the 1979 Toshiko Akiyoshi Quartet (Discomate) recording, Toshiko Plays Toshiko.

Track listing
All songs composed by Toshiko Akiyoshi:
"Long Yellow Road" – 7:16
"Memory" – 7:27
"Kogun" – 7:15
"Interlude" – 5:24
"Studio J" – 5:10
"Farewell To Mingus" – 8:41
"Deracinated Flower" – 7:35
"First Night" – 4:56
"Jammin' At Carnegie Hall" – 3:58
"Time Stream" – 2:36

Personnel
Toshiko Akiyoshi – piano
George Mraz – bass
Lewis Nash – drums
Lew Tabackin – tenor saxophone, flute (Tracks 3, 6, 8, 9)

References / External Links
Nippon Crown CRCJ-9137,  CRCJ-91008
Time Stream: Toshiko Plays Toshiko at [ Allmusic.com]

Toshiko Akiyoshi albums
1996 albums